Donnelly College is a private Catholic college in Kansas City, Kansas. The college offers bachelor's, associate degrees, and Nursing certifications. It is the only college or university in the state designated as a Hispanic-serving institution (HSI) and a minority-serving institution (MSI).

History
Donnelly College was established in 1949 by the Benedictine Sisters of Mount St. Scholastica and George Joseph Donnelly, Bishop of Kansas City, Kansas. The Benedictine Sisters provided the faculty for the college, which initially served as a two-year college.

Donnelly launched its first bachelor's degree program, Organizational Leadership, in 2006, and it is now known Business Leadership. Since then the college has added an additional bachelor's degrees in Information Systems.

In the fall of 2020 Donnelly transitioned into a new academic building.

References

External links

Educational institutions established in 1949
Two-year colleges in the United States
Education in Kansas City, Kansas
Education in Wyandotte County, Kansas
Buildings and structures in Wyandotte County, Kansas
1949 establishments in Kansas
Catholic universities and colleges in Kansas
Roman Catholic Archdiocese of Kansas City in Kansas